Before Everything & After is the sixth studio album by punk rock band MxPx, released on A&M Records. The album achieved the band's highest chart position on the Billboard 200, peaking at number 51.

In May and June 2003, the group supported Good Charlotte and New Found Glory on the Honda Civic Tour. Between late August and early October, the group supported Dashboard Confessional on their headlining US tour. "Everything Sucks (When You're Gone)" was released to radio on September 9. In January and February 2004, the band embarked on a co-headlining US tour with Simple Plan. They were supported by Sugarcult, Motion City Soundtrack and Billy Talent.

Track listing

Personnel 
 Mike Herrera – bass guitar, vocals
 Tom Wisniewski – guitar, vocals
 Yuri Ruley – drums, percussion  
 Jordan Pundik (New Found Glory) – backing vocals
 Benji Madden (Good Charlotte) – backing vocals
 Kris Roe (The Ataris) – backing vocals
 Ron Fair – executive producer
 Dave Jerden – producer, mixing 
 Steve Duda – keyboards
 Phil Shenale – keyboards, string arrangements 
 Brian Hall – guitar technician   
 Annette Cisneros – engineer  
 George Marino – mastering 
 Tom Lord-Alge – mixing 
 Chris Lord-Alge – mixing 
 Ben Grosse – mixing  
 Elan Trujillo – assistant 
 F. Scott Schafer – photography
 Marc Rhea – studio technician

Charts 
Album – Billboard (North America)

References 

MxPx albums
2003 albums
A&M Records albums
Albums produced by Dave Jerden